Mirza Mohammad Shafi Bandpi'i Mazandarani, better simply known as Mirza Shafi Mazandarani, was an Iranian statesman of Mazandarani origin, who served as the grand vizier of the Qajar king (shah) Fath-Ali Shah Qajar (r. 1797-1834) from 1801 to 1819.

He was born in 1744 at Babol, Mazandaran. He was the son of a certain Hajji Mirza Ahmad, and started his career as an bureaucrat at the court of Agha Mohammad Khan Qajar, who elevated him to the post of minister.

Sources 
 
 

1744 births
1819 deaths
18th-century Iranian politicians
19th-century Iranian politicians
People from Babol
Mazandarani people